The Royal Air Force Bomber Command Memorial is a memorial in The Green Park, London, commemorating the crews of RAF Bomber Command who embarked on missions during the Second World War. The memorial, on the south side of Piccadilly, facing Hyde Park Corner, was built to mark the sacrifice of 55,573 aircrew from Britain, Canada, Australia, New Zealand, Poland, Czechoslovakia and other allied countries, as well as civilians of all nations killed during raids.

Queen Elizabeth II unveiled the memorial on 28 June 2012, the year of her Diamond Jubilee.

History

A strong, often deadly use of force in strategic but often imprecise, and heavily counter-defended, bombing campaigns is the subject-matter.  This multi-year onslaught of joint Commonwealth and allied forces, led by RAF Bomber Command, hastened the end of the war and thus genocide such as in Nazi extermination camps, but makes the memorial controversial to some. The controversy meant that an official memorial to the aircrews was decades after the war which saw – not as a direct aim – at least 353,000 civilians killed in Germany from bombing. Despite describing bombers as "the means of victory" in 1940, British prime minister Winston Churchill did not mention Bomber Command in his speech in 1945.

An appeal was made for £5.6 million to build the memorial, and funding came from donations made by the public. Robin Gibb, the singer, became a key figure behind the appeal, working alongside Jim Dooley to raise funds and have the memorial built.

Liam O'Connor designed the memorial, built of Portland stone, which features a bronze  sculpture of seven aircrew, designed by the sculptor Philip Jackson to look as though they have just returned from a bombing mission and left their aircraft.

Aluminium from a Royal Canadian Air Force Handley Page Halifax of No. 426 Squadron that had crashed in Belgium in May 1944 was used to build the roof of the memorial, which was designed to evoke the geodetic structure of the Vickers Wellington. The Halifax, LW682 OW/M, had been removed from a swamp in 1997 with three of the crew found still at their posts. They were buried with full military honours in Geraardsbergen and the remains of the aircraft were sent to Canada. Some of the metal was used for the restoration of a Halifax in Trenton, Ontario, and the rest was melted down by the Bomber Command Museum of Canada in Nanton, Alberta. The Museum provided ingots for the memorial to commemorate the 10,659 of 55,573 Bomber Command aircrew killed during the war that were Canadian. Furthermore, some of this aluminium was supplied to the International Bomber Command Centre in Lincoln UK and forms the rear plate of the 'Additions Panel'.

On both walls inside the monument there are inscriptions that read: THIS MEMORIAL IS DEDICATED TO THE 55,573 AIRMEN FROM THE UNITED KINGDOM BRITISH COMMONWEALTH & ALLIED NATIONS WHO SERVED IN RAF BOMBER COMMAND & LOST THEIR LIVES OVER THE COURSE OF THE SECOND WORLD WAR and, on the opposite wall: THE FIGHTERS ARE OUR SALVATION BUT THE BOMBERS ALONE PROVIDE THE MEANS OF VICTORY . WINSTON CHURCHILL SEPTEMBER 1940. The inside face of the architrave to the rear of the statues carries the inscription This memorial also commemorates those of all nations who lost their lives in the bombing 1939-1945.
The large plinth carrying the statues bears the inscription HM Queen Elisabeth unveiled this monument 28 June in the year of her diamond jubilee. The rear face carries a text by Pericles: Freedom is the sure possession of those alone who have the courage to defend it.

Since opening

There was controversy in the lead-up to the official opening – a lack of forthcoming funds to pay for the projected £700,000 cost of the ceremony. Some veterans pledged money as security, in default of sufficient donations. In October 2012 it was reported that these pledging trustees would likely make up £500,000 of the total. 

Queen Elizabeth II officially opened the memorial on 28 June 2012, unveiling the bronze sculpture. The ceremony was attended by 6,000 veterans and family members of those killed, and the Avro Lancaster of the Battle of Britain Memorial Flight dropped red poppy petals over Green Park.

In May 2013 the memorial was vandalised. The word 'Islam' was spray-painted on the memorial and on the Animals in War Memorial in the near part of Hyde Park.

In March 2015, Les Munro, one of the last surviving members of the Dambusters Raid, intended to sell his war medals and flight logbook at auction to raise funds for the upkeep of the memorial. This was cancelled after Lord Ashcroft donated £75,000 to the Royal Air Force Benevolent Fund towards the upkeep, with a further NZ$19,500 donated by the Museum of Transport and Technology in Auckland, New Zealand, where the medals will go on display. Munro died that August.

See also
 International Bomber Command Centre

References

External links

 Bomber Command Memorial website
 Halifax LW682
 Geraardsbergen Memorial
 Bomber Command Museum of Canada

Buildings and structures completed in 2012
Military memorials in London
Royal Air Force memorials
Tourist attractions in the City of Westminster
Buildings and structures in the City of Westminster
Buildings and structures in Green Park
World War II memorials in England
Sculptures by Philip Jackson